Salisbury Cathedral from the Bishop's Grounds is an 1823 landscape painting by the nineteenth-century landscape painter John Constable (1776–1837). This image of Salisbury Cathedral, one of England's most famous medieval churches, is one of his most celebrated works, and was commissioned by one of his closest friends, John Fisher, The Bishop of Salisbury. The 1823 version of the painting has been in the collection of the Victoria & Albert Museum in London, since its bequest in 1857.

History

Constable visited Salisbury in 1811 and made a series of sketches of the cathedral, from the south-east, the south-west and from the east end. The artist selected a viewpoint from the bishop's garden (the south-east) and returned in 1820 to make further drawings and an open-air oil sketch, now in the National Gallery of Canada in Ottawa, which served as the model for the London version. Included in the paintings are figures of Dr. Fisher and his wife at the bottom left. Following the exhibition of the London version at the 1823 Royal Academy, Constable observed: "My Cathedral looks very well....It was the most difficult subject in Landscape I ever had upon my Easel. I have not flinched at the work of the windows, buttresses, &c. – but I have as usual made my escape in the Evanescence of the Chiaro-Oscuro". His patron took exception to the dark cloud over the cathedral, and when he commissioned a smaller replica, requested "a more serene sky".

A full-scale replica of the painting also resides at the Frick Collection in New York City. It is slightly different in that it shows different weather and hence light. Whereas the London version depicts the cathedral with an overcast sky, the version in the Frick shows the cathedral with a clear, bright sky. It was executed in 1825 after Fisher requested, in a letter, that Constable repaint the sky in the London version. Unfortunately Fisher died before Constable completed the work. A full-scale study for the Frick version is currently held at the Metropolitan Museum of Art.

Other versions

There is an earlier, homonymous version (1821–1822) of this painting at São Paulo Museum of Art in São Paulo. This is an early oil sketch for the London version.

Another, small version of the painting, measuring 62.9 × 75.9 cm, executed between 1823 and 1826, now resides at the Huntington Library in San Marino, California. 
This smaller, sunnier version was painted for John Fisher as a wedding present for his daughter, Elizabeth.

Constable painted many views of Salisbury Cathedral during his career, including Salisbury Cathedral and Leadenhall from the River Avon (1820) and more famously Salisbury Cathedral from the Meadows (1831).

See also
 Salisbury Cathedral from the Meadows
 100 Great Paintings

Bibliography

References

External links
Europe in the age of enlightenment and revolution, a catalog from The Metropolitan Museum of Art Libraries (fully available online as PDF), which contains material on this painting (see index)

Paintings by John Constable
Paintings in the collection of the Victoria and Albert Museum
1823 paintings
Landscape paintings
Salisbury Cathedral
Paintings in the Frick Collection
Paintings in the collection of the São Paulo Museum of Art
Collection of the Huntington Library
Churches in art
Cattle in art
England in art